These are the awards and nominations received by American musician, Brandon Flowers.

AltRock Awards
The AltRock Awards are presented annually by the American radio station i99Radio.

|-
|align="center" rowspan="1" | 2018 || Brandon Flowers || Best Male Singer || 
|-

AML Awards  
The annual AML Awards were established in 1977 and are given annually to the best work "by, for, and about Mormons."

GQ Men of the Year Awards 
The annual GQ Men of the Year Awards recognize the most influential men in a variety of fields and are run by the men's fashion magazine GQ.

NME Awards 
Founded by the music magazine NME in 1953, the NME Awards are awarded annually in the United Kingdom.

Q Awards 
The Q Awards were established in 1985 are the UK's annual music awards run by the music magazine Q.

Miscellaneous accolades

References

External links
 Official website

Flowers, Brandon